LSL is a three letter abbreviation which may refer to:

Sports
 Leicestershire Senior League, a football competition
 Leinster Senior League (association football)
 Leinster Senior League (cricket)
 Leinster Senior League (rugby union)

Computers
 Leisure Suit Larry, a series of adult adventure games
 Linden Scripting Language, a scripting language
 Logical shift left, a type of bitwise operation
 Larch Shared Language, a language for algebraic specification of abstract data types

Finance
 LSL Property Services, a UK-based company 
 Lincoln Savings and Loan Association, the financial institution at the heart of the Keating Five scandal
 Lesotho loti, currency of the Kingdom of Lesotho by ISO 4217 code

Other uses
 LSL (gene), a human gene
 LSL World Initiative, founded by former Prime Minister of Haiti Laurent Lamothe
 Laminated strand lumber, a type of engineered wood
 Landing Ship Logistics, an amphibious warfare vessel of the United Kingdom
 Lead service line, a pipe made of lead that connects between a water main to the water user's location
 Liberty Shoes Limited, an Indian footwear manufacturer
 Locomotive Services Limited, a train operator in England
 Long service leave, an employee vacation payable after long service in Australia and New Zealand
 Lower Specification Limit, a statistical measure used in a Process Window Index bounded by UCL/LCL and USL/LSL